Wong Ling Biu is a Malaysian politician who served as the Member of Parliament (MP) for Sarikei from May 2013 to November 2022. He is a member of the Democratic Action Party (DAP), a component party of the Pakatan Harapan (PH) and formerly Pakatan Rakyat (PR) coalitions.

On 7 March 2020, Wong was admitted at Sibu Hospital as a patient under investigation (PUI) for COVID-19 and was later tested positive on 15 March 2020. After a 79-day admission including 42 days of coma, Wong was finally discharged on 30 May 2020. His son, the national hammer thrower champion Jackie Wong Siew Cheer, had also contracted the COVID-19 virus from him, was discharged earlier on 27 May after 73 days treatment at the same hospital since 16 March. In 2021, Wong was among six elected representatives from Sarikei Division to receive their first dose of the COVID-19 vaccine.

In 2022 Malaysian general election, Wong decided not to contest for the Sarikei parliamentary seat. His son, Roderick Wong, which was his special assistant, replaced him for the quest of the seat. However, his Roderick failed to defend the seat.

Election results

References

Living people
1959 births
People from Sarawak
Malaysian politicians of Chinese descent
Malaysian Christians
Sarawak politicians
Democratic Action Party (Malaysia) politicians
Members of the Dewan Rakyat
21st-century Malaysian politicians